Minnie Lansbury née Minnie Glassman (1889 – 1 January 1922) was an English leading suffragette and an alderman on the first Labour-led council in the Metropolitan Borough of Poplar, England.

Biography

Minnie was the daughter of Annie and Isaac Glassman, a coal merchant. Her parents were Jewish immigrants. She was the first wife (married 1914) of Edgar Lansbury, son of George Lansbury, mayor of Poplar and later leader of the Labour Party. After Minnie's death, Edgar married actress Moyna Macgill and became the father of actor Angela Lansbury, Bruce Lansbury and Edgar Lansbury Jr.

Minnie Lansbury became a teacher, and joined the East London Federation of Suffragettes in 1915. She was also chair of the War Pensions Committee, fighting for the rights of widows, orphans and wounded from World War I.  She was elected alderman on Poplar’s first Labour council in 1919, after a change in the law allowed some women to receive Parliamentary suffrage and stand as candidates.

In 1921, she was one of five women on Poplar Council who, along with their male colleagues including her father-in-law George Lansbury, were jailed for six weeks for refusing to levy full rates in the poverty-stricken area. Due to her imprisonment, she developed pneumonia and died in 1922. She was buried in the Jewish cemetery in East Ham.

There is a Minnie Lansbury Memorial Clock on Electric House in Bow Road, Tower Hamlets that was erected in the 1930s. The Memorial Clock was restored in 2008 and re-fitted on Electric House. The clock was restored through a public appeal organised by the Jewish East End Celebration Society and the Heritage of London Trust. From the appeal the Heritage of London Trust raised over £13,000, which was given to Tower Hamlets Council to complete the restoration. Angela Lansbury was among those who made a donation towards the restoration of the clock. The restored clock, now painted green and gold, was officially unveiled in the presence of relatives of Minnie Lansbury and local people on Thursday, 16 October 2008.

Minnie's name and picture (and those of 58 other women's suffrage supporters) are on the plinth of the statue of Millicent Fawcett in Parliament Square, London, unveiled in 2018.

References

Bibliography
 "Timely reminder of a suffragette", Jewish Chronicle, 13 April 2007, p. 6
 "Lansbury's Tribute to suffragette 'heroine'", East London Advertiser, 16 October 2008, p. 4

External links
Workers Liberty article on Poplar
Exploring East London - Bow

1889 births
1922 deaths
Members of Poplar Metropolitan Borough Council
Labour Party (UK) councillors
English suffragists
Women councillors in England
Jewish British politicians
Jewish suffragists
English Jews
Members of the Workers' Socialist Federation
Lansbury family